Jay Gordon (born January 30, 1967) is an American singer and voice actor. He is best known as the lead singer and original member of the rock band Orgy, which he founded in 1994.

Career

1994–2000
Orgy's first release, 1998's Candyass, would prove to be a huge success and earned a platinum certification in sales, which was primarily fueled by the popularity of their cover of New Order's "Blue Monday", as well as that of their first single, "Stitches". The band would release singles of both during this period, which would contain numerous remixes of the songs, some of which were created by Gordon himself, a trend which would continue to occur throughout all of Orgy's subsequent single releases.

In 2000, Orgy released their second full-length album, Vapor Transmission, which, despite gaining a quite respectable sales performance, did not repeat the wild success of its predecessor.

2000–present
The period following the release of Vapor Transmission proved to be a tumultuous period for the band. Orgy left Elementree and Reprise Records. Drummer Bobby Hewitt left the band in order to join his brother Fab Fernandez in the group Snake River Conspiracy, although he would eventually return. It would be four years between the release of Vapor Transmission and Orgy's third album, 2004's Punk Statik Paranoia.

In 2002, Gordon performed the song "Slept So Long" for the Queen of the Damned soundtrack, due to contractual limitations which restricted composer Jonathan Davis from performing the vocals to his composed songs as they appeared upon the actual soundtrack (although Davis did, in fact, perform all musical tracks within the movie itself). Gordon has also appeared with his band Orgy on other soundtracks such as Zoolander, which featured the previously unreleased song "Faces".

Gordon remixed "Points of Authority", a song by Linkin Park from their album Hybrid Theory, for the latter's remix album Reanimation. This was entitled "Pts.OF.Athrty", which was released as the first and only single of Reanimation, and has achieved moderate success at the Billboard charts.

In 2004, he voiced several characters for the video game Vampire: The Masquerade – Bloodlines. In 2005, he provided an additional voice or voices in the video game True Crime: New York City, and also voiced J. Jonah Jameson in Spider-Man and Spider-Man 2.

Around 2004, Gordon would collaborate with Kinya Sawaguchi and members of TEAM Entertainment from Japan to work on an American rock and metal styled image album for the Daisuke Ishiwatari anime styled and rock inspired fighting game Guilty Gear XX. With only a week open, Gordon would serve as the supervisor and mixing engineer at his recording studio in Los Angeles, and hired burgeoning talent throughout L.A.'s rock and roll scene at the time to work on the album. Released on May 19th, 2004 in Japan, the album would be known as Guilty Gear XX In L.A. Vocal Edition, remixing select songs with vocal renditions to capture the sound of the SoCal and West Coast American rock and metal scene with Ishiwatari's composition work and Guilty Gear's signature multi genre thrash and metal soundtrack. 

In October 2010, members of Orgy collectively brought accusations against Gordon of having "fired the band". In response, Gordon released a public statement denying the claims. Orgy released a new single titled "Wide Awake and Dead" on March 18, 2014 and shot a video for "Wide Awake and Dead" on April 22. Orgy released the first of two EPs in 2015, titled Talk Sick, and an unnamed EP that was released in 2016.

Discography
Orgy
Candyass
Vapor Transmission
Punk Statik Paranoia
Talk Sick (EP)

References

External links
Official website
Jay Gordon's MySpace profile
D1 Music, Jay Gordon's record label
 
 Jay Gordon's full discography on Discogs

1967 births
African-American rock musicians
African-American rock singers
Alternative metal musicians
American heavy metal singers
American industrial musicians
20th-century African-American male singers
Living people
Nu metal singers
Orgy (band) members
Remixers
The Wondergirls members
Industrial metal musicians
21st-century African-American male singers